Appias perlucens is a butterfly in the family Pieridae. It is found from Cameroon to Angola and the Democratic Republic of the Congo. The habitat consists of forests. It closely resembles Appias sylvia.

References

Butterflies described in 1898
Appias (butterfly)
Butterflies of Africa
Taxa named by Arthur Gardiner Butler